The 1964 United States presidential election in Maryland took place on November 3, 1964, as part of the 1964 United States presidential election. State voters chose 10 representatives, or electors, to the Electoral College, who voted for president and vice president.

Maryland was won by incumbent President Lyndon B. Johnson (D–Texas), with 65.47% of the popular vote, against Senator Barry Goldwater (R–Arizona), with 34.53% of the popular vote. , this is the last election in which Harford County, Carroll County, Washington County, Wicomico County, Worcester County, Queen Anne's County and Caroline County voted for a Democratic Presidential candidate. Anne Arundel County would not vote Democratic again until 2016, while Frederick and Talbot counties  would not do so until 2020, with Donald Trump being the first Republican to lose all three of these counties since this election. Despite the fact Maryland would eventually go on to be a very safe Democratic state, this is the last time a Democrat would win a majority of the state’s counties in a presidential election. This also marks the only election in which the Democratic candidate was able to win all of the counties that make up the Washington metropolitan area.

Results

Results by county

Counties that flipped from Republican to Democratic
Allegany
Anne Arundel
Baltimore (County)
Caroline
Carroll
Cecil
Frederick
Garrett
Harford
Howard
Kent
Somerset
Talbot
Washington
Wicomico
Worcester

Counties that flipped from Democratic to Republican
Dorchester

See also
 United States presidential elections in Maryland
 1964 United States presidential election
 1964 United States elections

Notes

References 

Maryland
1964
Presidential